The Tower of l'Osse or Tower of Losso is a Genoese tower located in the commune of Cagnano (Haute-Corse) on the Corsica. The tower lies on the east coast of Cap Corse.

The construction of the tower was begun in March 1599. It was one of a series of coastal defences constructed by the Republic of Genoa between 1530 and 1620 to stem the attacks by Barbary pirates. In 1926 the tower was listed as one of the official historical monuments of France. The date of construction given in the database (1520) is incorrect.

See also
List of Genoese towers in Corsica

Notes and references

External links

 Includes information on how to reach 90 towers and many photographs.

Towers in Corsica
Monuments historiques of Corsica